Kenth Jonsson (born 14 March 1964) is a Swedish ice sledge hockey player. He won medals for Sweden at the 1994 Winter Paralympics, 1998 Winter Paralympics and 2002 Winter Paralympics. He also competed for Team Sweden at the 2006 Winter Paralympics, 2014 Winter Paralympics and the 2018 Winter Paralympics.

References

Living people
1964 births
Paralympic sledge hockey players of Sweden
Swedish sledge hockey players
Paralympic bronze medalists for Sweden
Paralympic gold medalists for Sweden
1994 Winter Paralympians of Sweden
1998 Winter Paralympians of Sweden
2002 Winter Paralympians of Sweden
2006 Winter Paralympians of Sweden
2014 Winter Paralympians of Sweden
2018 Winter Paralympians of Sweden
Ice sledge hockey players at the 1994 Winter Paralympics
Ice sledge hockey players at the 1998 Winter Paralympics
Ice sledge hockey players at the 2002 Winter Paralympics
Ice sledge hockey players at the 2006 Winter Paralympics
Ice sledge hockey players at the 2014 Winter Paralympics
Para ice hockey players at the 2018 Winter Paralympics
Medalists at the 1994 Winter Paralympics
Medalists at the 1998 Winter Paralympics
Medalists at the 2002 Winter Paralympics
Paralympic medalists in sledge hockey
People from Sundsvall
Sportspeople from Västernorrland County
20th-century Swedish people
21st-century Swedish people